Nea Vrasna (Néa Vrasná ) is a village and a community of the Volvi municipality. Before the 2011 local government reform it was part of the municipality of Agios Georgios. The 2011 census recorded 2,556 inhabitants in the village. Nea Vrasna is a part of the community of Vrasna.

See also
 List of settlements in the Thessaloniki regional unit

References

Populated places in Thessaloniki (regional unit)